The Ronda Depression (also Hoya de Ronda and occasionally Vega de Ronda) is a sedimentary basin in the form of a plateau located within the Cordillera Penibética, in the autonomous community of Andalusia, Spain. It is one of the series of valleys forming the Surco Intrabético.

Its predominantly composed of sedimentary materials such as sandstones, clays and conglomerates. It is surrounded by various ridges of the Serranía de Ronda and forms a nexus between the valley of the Guadalteba, which opens to the north; the valley of the Guadiaro, to the southwest; and the valley of the Genal, to the southeast. It is flat, but crossed by canyons popularly known as "tajos" ("pits").

The principal rivers are the Guadalevín and the Guadalcobacín, whose confluence forms the Guadiaro.

The predominant climate is Mediterranean with as strong mix of Continental: cold winters and hot summers.

As for flora, Oaks and Cork Oaks dominate, with some presence of Portuguese Oak (Quercus faginea) in wetter areas. On the riverbanks are riparian forests with elms, cottonwoods, poplars and willows. Human activity has thinned the forest, with farmland, olive orchards, pastures, and urbanized areas. Grazing of  livestock has degraded oak forest to scrubland with plants such as thyme, rosemary, and esparto.

References

External links 
Comprehensive tourist information about Ronda in English
 www.laserrania.org

Ronda
Landforms of Andalusia
Sedimentary basins of Europe